Dinaraea is a genus of rove beetles in the family Staphylinidae. There are about 16 described species in Dinaraea.

Species
These 16 species belong to the genus Dinaraea:

 Dinaraea aequata (Erichson, 1837)
 Dinaraea angustula (Gyllenhal, 1810)
 Dinaraea arcana (Erichson, 1839)
 Dinaraea backusensis Klimaszewski & Brunke, 2012
 Dinaraea bicornis Klimaszewski & Webster, 2013
 Dinaraea borealis Lohse in Lohse, Klimaszewski & Smetana, 1990
 Dinaraea curtipenis Klimaszewski & Webster, 2013
 Dinaraea linearis (Gravenhorst, 1802)
 Dinaraea longipenis Klimaszewski & Webster, 2013
 Dinaraea melanocornis Mulsant & Rey, 1873
 Dinaraea pacei Klimaszewski & Langor, 2011
 Dinaraea piceana Klimaszewski & Jacobs, 2013
 Dinaraea planaris (Mäklin in Mannerheim, 1852)
 Dinaraea quadricornis Klimaszewski & Webster, 2013
 Dinaraea subdepressa (Bernhauer, 1907)
 Dinaraea worki Klimaszewski & Jacobs, 2013

References

Further reading

External links

 

Aleocharinae
Articles created by Qbugbot